Koloonella is a genus of sea snails, marine gastropod mollusks in the family Murchisonellidae, the pyrams and their allies.

Species
Species within the genus Koloonella include:

 Koloonella angusta (Watson, 1885) 
 Koloonella buijsi (van Aartsen, Gittenberger & Goud, 2000)
 Koloonella calva (Schander, 1994)
 Koloonella capricornia (Hedley, 1906)
 Koloonella coacta (Watson, 1886)
 Koloonella harrisonae (Tate & May, 1900)
 Koloonella hasta (Laseron, 1951)
 Koloonella hawaiiensis Kay, 1979
 Koloonella ignorabilis (Peñas & Rolán, 1997)
 Koloonella laxa (Watson, 1886)
 Koloonella micra (Petterd, 1884)
 Koloonella minutissima (Laseron, 1951)
 Koloonella moniliformis (Hedley & Musson, 1891)
 Koloonella plunketti (Cotton & Godfrey, 1932) 
 Koloonella subtilis (Watson, 1886)
 Koloonella tenuis Laseron, 1959
 Koloonella tomacula (Laseron, 1951)
 Koloonella tricincta (Tate, 1898)
 Koloonella turrita (Petterd, 1884)
Species brought into synonymy
 Koloonella anabathron (Hedley, 1906): synonym of Murchisonella anabathron (Hedley, 1906)

The species is Koloonella hawaiiensis Kay, 1979, considered valid in ITIS, but also listed as Eulimella hawaiiensis in Severns, 2011

References

 Robba E. (2013) Tertiary and Quaternary fossil pyramidelloidean gastropods of Indonesia. Scripta Geologica 144: 1-191.

External links
 To World Register of Marine Species
 To ITIS

Murchisonellidae